{{DISPLAYTITLE:C12H18O}}
The molecular formula C12H18O (molar mass: 178.27 g/mol, exact mass: 178.1358 u) may refer to:

 Amylmetacresol (AMC)
 2,4-Dimethyl-6-tert-butylphenol
 Propofol

Molecular formulas